Cimo, or the Compagnie industrielle de Monthey SA, is a chemical company based at Monthey in the Swiss canton of Valais. It is jointly owned by BASF and Syngenta.

References

External links 
 Company website

Chemical companies of Switzerland
Companies based in Monthey